Great Shu (Chinese: 大蜀, Pinyin: Dàshǔ) called in retrospect Former Shu (Chinese: 前蜀, Pinyin: Qiánshǔ) or occasionally Wang Shu (王蜀), was one of the Ten Kingdoms formed during the chaotic period between the rules of the Tang dynasty and the Song dynasty.  It existed in 907–925 CE. It was the third state named "Shu" on the same territory, the second one having been Shu Han.

The country's name changed from "Shu" to "Han" (Chinese: 漢, Pinyin: Hàn) in 917–918, which is not to be confused with another contemporaneous Chinese kingdom during the same Five Dynasties and Ten Kingdoms period, the Southern Han, 917–971 CE.

Rulers

See also
Later Shu

References

Further reading
 

 
Five Dynasties and Ten Kingdoms
Former countries in Chinese history
History of Sichuan
10th-century establishments in China
907 establishments
920s disestablishments
10th-century disestablishments in China
States and territories established in the 900s
States and territories disestablished in the 920s
925 disestablishments
Former kingdoms